Aboobakar Augustin (born September 28, 1983) is a Mauritian footballer who currently plays for Cercle de Joachim in the Mauritian League as a goalkeeper.

Career

Senior career
Augustin started off his professional career in 2008 with Savanne SC. In 2011, he transferred to Petite Rivière Noire SC. In 2013, he moved to fellow Mauritian Premier League club Cercle de Joachim.

International career
Augustin has earned five caps for Mauritius since 2009.

External links

References

Living people
1983 births
Mauritian footballers
Mauritius international footballers
Petite Rivière Noire FC players
Association football goalkeepers
Mauritian Premier League players
Cercle de Joachim SC players
Savanne SC players